The list of shipwrecks in June 1878 includes ships sunk, foundered, grounded, or otherwise lost during June 1878.

1 June

2 June

4 June

5 June

6 June

7 June

8 June

9 June

10 June

11 June

12 June

13 June

14 June

15 June

16 June

17 June

) was despatched and towed her in to Punta Arenas, where she arrived on 3 August. Subsequently condemned and sold to the Chilean Navy for use as a hulk.

19 June

20 June

21 June

22 June

23 June

24 June

25 June

26 June

{{shipwreck list item
|ship=St. Andrews
|flag=
|desc=The vessel was sunk in a collision with 'Peshtigo in Lake Michigan near Beaver Island.
}}

27 June

 

28 June

29 June

30 June

Unknown date

References

Bibliography
Ingram, C. W. N., and Wheatley, P. O., (1936) Shipwrecks: New Zealand disasters 1795–1936.'' Dunedin, NZ: Dunedin Book Publishing Association.

1878-06
Maritime incidents in June 1878